Welby Sheldon "Buddy" Bailey (born March 28, 1957) is an American professional baseball manager and former Major League coach with 40 years of experience in the game, 30 as a minor league manager. Bailey is currently manager for the Myrtle Beach Pelicans of the Carolina League. He has been a member of the Chicago Cubs' organization since 2006.

In , his first season as manager of the Myrtle Beach Pelicans of the Carolina League, the Cubs' Class A-Advanced affiliate, he led the Pelicans to the league championship. The veteran minor league pilot won his 1,500th game in May 2011 and exceeded the 2,000-win mark during 2016.

Atlanta Braves organization
A catcher, he threw and batted right-handed, stood 6 feet (1.83 m) tall and weighed 193 pounds (87.5 kg). Bailey never reached Major League Baseball as a player, hitting .210 with six home runs over four minor league seasons, mostly at the Class A level. He managed in the Atlanta organization from 1983–90, winning the Southern League pennant as pilot of the Greenville Braves in 1988.

Boston Red Sox organization
Bailey joined the Boston Red Sox as manager of their Class A Lynchburg Red Sox affiliate in the Carolina League in 1991–92. He then became the ninth manager in the history of the Triple-A Pawtucket Red Sox in 1993, the youngest manager in team history at the time. He would lead the "PawSox" for seven seasons, spread over two terms (1993–96; 2002–04). Under Bailey, the PawSox played for the 2003 Governors' Cup, the championship of the International League. They were defeated by the Durham Bulls. He won Manager of the Year twice in the IL, in 1996 and 2003, becoming one of only four managers to do that in league history.

Bailey also spent one season (2000) in the Major Leagues as the bench coach for the parent Red Sox and was Boston's advance scout, field coordinator of minor league instruction, or roving catching instructor during the period of 1997–99 and in 2001.

Bailey also has been the manager of Tigres de Aragua of the Venezuelan Professional Baseball League (LVBP) since 2002 and has collected six championships and two sub-championship in nine finals, while leading the Tigres to the 2009 Caribbean Series title. He also was named the LVBP Manager of the Year in the 2006–07 season.

Chicago Cubs organization
Bailey initially joined the Cub system in 2006 as its roving minor league catching instructor, before assuming the managerial reins of the Daytona Cubs of the Class A Florida State League in the middle of that season. He then spent 2007 and 2008 as a manager in high classification leagues, including one year as manager of the Smokies. Bailey spent 2007 as pilot of the Iowa Cubs of the Triple-A Pacific Coast League, and finished second overall in the PCL American North Division standings with a 79–65 record. In 2008, his Smokies finished in last place in the SL's North Division with a mark of 62–77 (.446). He was replaced by  Ryne Sandberg as Smokies' manager on December 17, 2008.

Bailey then returned to Daytona for the 2009–11 seasons. His 2011 Daytona Cubs finished 76–61 during the regular season and won the first-half championship of the Florida State League's Northern Division. The Cubs then won the FSL playoff championship, earning Bailey a promotion to his second term as manager of the Double-A Smokies for 2012. His 2012 club missed the SL playoffs (compiling a record of 72–68), but the 2013 edition finished 76–62, the best overall record in the Southern League North Division, to qualify for the postseason.  The Smokies then fell to the eventual league champion Birmingham Barons in the first playoff round, three games to two.

His 2016 Pelicans won 82 of 139 games played (.590) during the regular Carolina League season, then defeated the Salem Red Sox and Lynchburg Hillcats in the playoffs to win the league title. Bailey was rehired for the  season on December 16, 2016. In , his Pelicans finished 73–67 and won their first-half division title, but fell in the first playoff round.

After spending the 2019 season with the Low-A South Bend Cubs, Bailey returned to managing the Pelicans for the 2021 season.

References

External links

 
 

 
 

 
 
   
 
 

 
 

 
 

 
 

 
 

1957 births
Living people
Anderson Braves players
Baseball catchers
Boston Red Sox coaches
Boston Red Sox scouts
Caribbean Series managers
Durham Bulls managers
Durham Bulls players
Iowa Cubs managers
Kingsport Braves players
Major League Baseball bench coaches
Pawtucket Red Sox managers
People from Amherst, Virginia
People from Norristown, Pennsylvania
Savannah Braves players
Sportspeople from Montgomery County, Pennsylvania
American expatriate baseball people in Venezuela